The British Expeditionary Force order of battle 1914, as originally despatched to France in August and September 1914, at the beginning of World War I. The British Army prior to World War I traced its origins to the increasing demands of imperial expansion together with inefficiencies highlighted during the Crimean War, which led to the Cardwell and Childers Reforms of the late 19th century. These gave the British Army its modern shape, and defined its regimental system. The Haldane Reforms of 1907 formally created an Expeditionary force and the Territorial Force.

The British Army was different from the French and German Armies at the beginning of the conflict in that it was made up of professional soldiers who had volunteered, rather than conscripts. It was also considerably smaller than its French and German counterparts.

The outbreak of the First World War in August 1914 saw the bulk of the changes in the Haldane reforms put to the test. The British Expeditionary Force (BEF) of six divisions was quickly sent to the Continent.

This order of battle includes all combat units, including engineer and artillery units, but not medical, supply and signal units.
Commanders are listed for all formations of brigade size or higher, and for significant staff positions.

Plans for the Expeditionary Force
Under pre-war plans, an expeditionary force was to be organised from among the Regular Army forces in the United Kingdom, with a strength of six infantry divisions and one cavalry division (72 infantry battalions and 14 cavalry regiments), plus support units.

It was planned that the seven divisions would be centrally controlled by General Headquarters and as such no plans were made for intermediate levels of command. One corps staff was maintained in peacetime, but the decision was made on mobilisation to create a second (and later a third) in order to better conform with the French command structure; both of these had to be improvised.

At the time of mobilisation, there were significant fears of a German landing in force on the English east coast, and as such the decision was taken to hold back two divisions for home defence, and only send four, plus the cavalry division, to France for the present. The 5th was eventually despatched at the end of August, and the 6th in early September.

GHQ

The initial Commander-in-Chief of the BEF was Field-Marshal Sir John French. His Chief of Staff was Lieutenant-General Sir A. J. Murray, with Major-General H. H. Wilson as his deputy. GSO 1 (Operations) was Colonel G. M. Harper, and GSO 1 (Intelligence) was Colonel G. M. W. Macdonogh.

The Adjutant-General was Major-General Sir C. F. N. Macready, with Major-General E. R. C. Graham as Deputy Adjutant-General and Colonel A. E. J. Cavendish as Assistant Adjutant-General. The Quartermaster-General was Major-General Sir W. R. Robertson, with Colonel C. T. Dawkins as Assistant Quartermaster-General. The Royal Artillery was commanded by Major-General W. F. L. Lindsay, and the Royal Engineers by Brigadier-General G. H. Fowke.

GHQ Troops, Royal Engineers 
General Headquarters Troops controlled the army group engineers.  It had the following structure in 1914:

 1st Bridging Train, Royal Engineers
 2nd Bridging Train, Royal Engineers
 1st Siege Company, Royal Monmouthshire Militia, Royal Engineers
 4th Siege Company, Royal Monmouthshire Militia, Royal Engineers
 1st Siege Company, Royal Anglesey Militia, Royal Engineers
 2nd Siege Company, Royal Anglesey Militia, Royal Engineers
 1st Ranging Section, Royal Engineers
 Railway Transport Establishment
 8th Railway Company, Royal Engineers
 10th Railway Company, Royal Engineers
 2nd Railway Company, Royal Monmouthshire Militia, Royal Engineers
 3rd Railway Company, Royal Monmouthshire Militia, Royal Engineers
 3rd Railway Company, Royal Anglesey Militia, Royal Engineers
 29th General Headquarters Troops Company, Royal Engineers
 20th Fortress Company, Royal Engineers
 25th Fortress Company, Royal Engineers
 31st Fortress Company, Royal Engineers
 42nd Fortress Company, Royal Engineers
 1st Printing Company, Royal Engineers

Cavalry
There was no permanently established cavalry division in the British Army; on mobilisation, the 1st through to 4th Cavalry Brigades were grouped together to form a division, whilst the 5th Cavalry Brigade remained as an independent unit.

On 6 September, the 3rd Cavalry Brigade was detached to act jointly with the 5th, under the overall command of Brigadier-General Gough. This force was re-designated the 2nd Cavalry Division on 16 September.

Cavalry Division
The Cavalry Division was commanded by Major-General Edmund Allenby, with Colonel John Vaughan as GSO 1 and Brigadier-General B. F. Drake commanding the Royal Horse Artillery.
1st Cavalry Brigade (Brigadier-General C. J. Briggs)
2nd Dragoon Guards (Queen's Bays)
5th (Princess Charlotte of Wales's) Dragoon Guards
11th (Prince Albert's Own) Hussars
2nd Cavalry Brigade (Brigadier-General H. de Lisle)
4th (Royal Irish) Dragoon Guards
9th (Queen's Royal) Lancers
18th (Queen Mary's Own) Hussars
3rd Cavalry Brigade (Brigadier-General H. de la P. Gough)
4th (Queen's Own) Hussars
5th (Royal Irish) Lancers
16th (The Queen's) Lancers
4th Cavalry Brigade (Brigadier-General Hon. C. E. Bingham)
Household Cavalry Composite Regiment
6th Dragoon Guards (Carabiners)
3rd (King's Own) Hussars
Divisional troops:
III Brigade RHA
D Battery, RHA
E Battery, RHA
VII Brigade RHA
I Battery, RHA
L Battery, RHA
1st Field Squadron, RE

Independent brigade
5th Cavalry Brigade (Brigadier-General Sir P. W. Chetwode)
2nd Dragoons (Royal Scots Greys)
12th (Prince of Wales's Royal) Lancers
20th Hussars
J Battery, RHA

I Corps
I Corps was commanded by Lieutenant-General Sir Douglas Haig. His senior staff officers were Brigadier-General J. E. Gough (Chief of Staff), Brigadier-General H. S. Horne (commanding Royal Artillery) and Brigadier-General S. R. Rice (commanding Royal Engineers).

1st Division
1st Division was commanded by Major-General S. H. Lomax, with Colonel R. Fanshawe as GSO 1. Brigadier-General N. D. Findlay commanded the Royal Artillery, and Lieutenant-Colonel A. L. Schreiber commanded the Royal Engineers.

1st (Guards) Brigade (Brigadier-General F. I. Maxse)
1st Coldstream Guards
1st Scots Guards
1st The Black Watch (Royal Highlanders)
2nd The Royal Munster Fusiliers
2nd Infantry Brigade (Brigadier-General E. S. Bulfin)
2nd The Royal Sussex Regiment
1st The Loyal North Lancashire Regiment
1st The Northamptonshire Regiment
2nd The King's Royal Rifle Corps
3rd Infantry Brigade (Brigadier-General H. J. S. Landon)
1st The Queen's (Royal West Surrey Regiment)
1st The South Wales Borderers
1st The Gloucestershire Regiment
2nd The Welch Regiment
Divisional Troops
Mounted Troops
A Squadron, 15th (The King's) Hussars
1st Cyclist Company
Artillery
XXV Brigade RFA
113th Battery, RFA
114th Battery, RFA
115th Battery, RFA
XXVI Brigade RFA
116th Battery, RFA
117th Battery, RFA
118th Battery, RFA
XXXIX Brigade RFA
46th Battery, RFA
51st Battery, RFA
54th Battery, RFA
XLIII (Howitzer) Brigade RFA
30th (Howitzer) Battery, RFA
40th (Howitzer) Battery, RFA
57th (Howitzer) Battery, RFA
26th Heavy Battery, RGA
Engineers
23rd Field Company, RE
26th Field Company, RE

2nd Division
2nd Division was commanded by Major-General C. C. Monro, with Colonel Hon. F. Gordon as GSO 1. Brigadier-General E. M. Perceval commanded the Royal Artillery, and Lieutenant-Colonel R. H. H. Boys commanded the Royal Engineers.

4th (Guards) Brigade (Brigadier-General Robert Scott-Kerr)
2nd Grenadier Guards
2nd Coldstream Guards
3rd Coldstream Guards
1st Irish Guards
5th Infantry Brigade (Brigadier-General Richard Haking)
2nd The Worcestershire Regiment
2nd The Oxfordshire and Buckinghamshire Light Infantry
2nd The Highland Light Infantry
2nd The Connaught Rangers
6th Infantry Brigade (Brigadier-General R. H. Davies, New Zealand Staff Corps)
1st The King's (Liverpool Regiment)
2nd The South Staffordshire Regiment
1st Princess Charlotte of Wales's (Royal Berkshire Regiment)
1st The King's Royal Rifle Corps
Divisional Troops
Mounted Troops
B Squadron, 15th (The King's) Hussars
2nd Cyclist Company
Artillery
XXXIV Brigade RFA
22nd Battery, RFA
50th Battery, RFA
70th Battery, RFA
XXXVI Brigade RFA
15th Battery, RFA
48th Battery, RFA
71st Battery, RFA
XLI Brigade RFA
9th Battery, RFA
16th Battery, RFA
17th Battery, RFA
XLIV (Howitzer) Brigade RFA
47th (Howitzer) Battery, RFA
56th (Howitzer) Battery, RFA
60th (Howitzer) Battery, RFA
35th Heavy Battery, RGA
Engineers
5th Field Company, RE
11th Field Company, RE

II Corps
II Corps was commanded by Lieutenant-General Sir James Grierson. His senior staff officers were Brigadier-General George Forestier-Walker (Chief of Staff), Brigadier-General A. H. Short (commanding Royal Artillery) and Brigadier-General A. E. Sandbach (commanding Royal Engineers).

Lieutenant-General Grierson died on a train between Rouen and Amiens on 17 August; General Sir Horace Smith-Dorrien took over command at Bavai, on 21 August at 4pm.

3rd Division
3rd Division was commanded by Major-General Hubert I. W. Hamilton, with Colonel F. R. F. Boileau as GSO 1. Brigadier-General F. D. V. Wing commanded the Royal Artillery, and Lieutenant-Colonel C. S. Wilson commanded the Royal Engineers.

7th Infantry Brigade (Brigadier-General F. W. N. McCracken)
3rd The Worcestershire Regiment
2nd The Prince of Wales's Volunteers (South Lancashire Regiment)
1st The Duke of Edinburgh's (Wiltshire Regiment)
2nd The Royal Irish Rifles
8th Infantry Brigade (Brigadier-General B. J. C. Doran)
2nd The Royal Scots (Lothian Regiment)
2nd The Royal Irish Regiment
4th The Duke of Cambridge's Own (Middlesex Regiment)
1st The Gordon Highlanders

9th Infantry Brigade (Brigadier-General F. C. Shaw)
1st The Northumberland Fusiliers
4th The Royal Fusiliers (City of London Regiment)
1st The Lincolnshire Regiment
1st The Royal Scots Fusiliers
Divisional Troops
Mounted Troops
C Squadron, 15th (The King's) Hussars
3rd Cyclist Company
Artillery
XXIII Brigade RFA
107th Battery, RFA
108th Battery, RFA
109th Battery, RFA
XL Brigade RFA
6th Battery, RFA
23rd Battery, RFA
49th Battery, RFA
XLII Brigade RFA
29th Battery, RFA
41st Battery, RFA
45th Battery, RFA
XXX (Howitzer) Brigade RFA
128th (Howitzer) Battery, RFA
129th (Howitzer) Battery, RFA
130th (Howitzer) Battery, RFA
48th Heavy Battery, RGA
Engineers
56th Field Company, RE
57th Field Company, RE

5th Division
5th Division was commanded by Major-General Sir C. Fergusson, with Lieutenant-Colonel C. F. Romer as GSO 1. Brigadier-General J. E. W. Headlam commanded the Royal Artillery, and Lieutenant-Colonel J. A. S. Tulloch commanded the Royal Engineers.

13th Infantry Brigade (Brigadier-General G. J. Cuthbert)
2nd The King's Own Scottish Borderers
2nd The Duke of Wellington's (West Riding Regiment)
1st The Queen's Own (Royal West Kent Regiment)
2nd The King's Own (Yorkshire Light Infantry)
14th Infantry Brigade (Brigadier-General S. P. Rolt)
2nd The Suffolk Regiment
1st The East Surrey Regiment
1st The Duke of Cornwall's Light Infantry
2nd The Manchester Regiment
15th Infantry Brigade (Brigadier-General A. E. W. Count Gleichen)
1st The Norfolk Regiment
1st The Bedfordshire Regiment
1st The Cheshire Regiment
1st The Dorsetshire Regiment
Divisional Troops
Mounted Troops
A Squadron, 19th (Queen Alexandra's Own Royal) Hussars
5th Cyclist Company
Artillery
XV Brigade RFA
11th Battery, RFA
52nd Battery, RFA
80th Battery, RFA
XXVII Brigade RFA
119th Battery, RFA
120th Battery, RFA
121st Battery, RFA
XXVIII Brigade RFA
122nd Battery, RFA
123rd Battery, RFA
124th Battery, RFA
VIII (Howitzer) Brigade RFA
37th (Howitzer) Battery, RFA
61st (Howitzer) Battery, RFA
65th (Howitzer) Battery, RFA
108th Heavy Battery, RGA
Engineers
17th Field Company, RE
59th Field Company, RE

III Corps
III Corps was formed in France on 31 August 1914, commanded by Major-General W. P. Pulteney. His senior staff officers were Brigadier-General J. P. Du Cane (Chief of Staff), Brigadier-General E. J. Phipps-Hornby (commanding Royal Artillery) and Brigadier-General F. M. Glubb (commanding Royal Engineers).

4th Division
The 4th Division landed in France on the night of 22 August and 23. It was commanded by Major-General T. D'O. Snow, with Colonel J. E. Edmonds as GSO 1. Brigadier-General G. F. Milne commanded the Royal Artillery, and Lieutenant-Colonel H. B. Jones commanded the Royal Engineers.

10th Infantry Brigade (Brigadier-General J. A. L. Haldane)
1st The Royal Warwickshire Regiment
2nd Seaforth Highlanders (Ross-shire Buffs, The Duke of Albany's)
1st Princess Victoria's (Royal Irish Fusiliers)
2nd The Royal Dublin Fusiliers
11th Infantry Brigade (Brigadier-General A. G. Hunter-Weston)
1st Prince Albert's (Somerset Light Infantry)
1st The East Lancashire Regiment
1st The Hampshire Regiment
1st The Rifle Brigade (Prince Consort's Own)
12th Infantry Brigade (Brigadier-General H. F. M. Wilson)
1st King's Own (Royal Lancaster Regiment)
2nd The Lancashire Fusiliers
2nd The Royal Inniskilling Fusiliers
2nd The Essex Regiment
Divisional Troops
Mounted Troops
B Squadron, 19th (Queen Alexandra's Own Royal) Hussars
4th Cyclist Company
Artillery
XIV Brigade RFA
39th Battery, RFA
68th Battery, RFA
88th Battery, RFA
XXIX Brigade RFA
125th Battery, RFA
126th Battery, RFA
127th Battery, RFA
XXXII Brigade RFA
27th Battery, RFA
134th Battery, RFA
135th Battery, RFA
XXXVII (Howitzer) Brigade RFA
31st (Howitzer) Battery, RFA
35th (Howitzer) Battery, RFA
55th (Howitzer) Battery, RFA
31st Heavy Battery, RGA
Engineers
7th Field Company, RE
9th Field Company, RE

6th Division
The 6th Division embarked for France on 8 and 9 September. It was commanded by Major-General J. L. Keir, with Colonel W. T. Furse as GSO 1. Brigadier-General W. L. H. Paget commanded the Royal Artillery, and Lieutenant-Colonel G. C. Kemp commanded the Royal Engineers.

16th Infantry Brigade (Brigadier-General E. C. Ingouville-Williams)
1st The Buffs (East Kent Regiment)
1st The Leicestershire Regiment
1st The King's (Shropshire Light Infantry)
2nd The York and Lancaster Regiment
17th Infantry Brigade (Brigadier-General W. R. B. Doran)
1st The Royal Fusiliers (City of London Regiment)
1st The Prince of Wales's (North Staffordshire Regiment)
2nd The Prince of Wales's Leinster Regiment (Royal Canadians)
3rd The Rifle Brigade (The Prince Consort's Own)
18th Infantry Brigade (Brigadier-General W. N. Congreve)
1st The Prince of Wales's Own (West Yorkshire Regiment)
1st The East Yorkshire Regiment
2nd The Sherwood Foresters (Nottinghamshire and Derbyshire Regiment)
2nd The Durham Light Infantry
Divisional Troops
Mounted Troops
C Squadron, 19th (Queen Alexandra's Own Royal) Hussars
6th Cyclist Company
Artillery
II Brigade RFA
21st Battery, RFA
42nd Battery, RFA
53rd Battery, RFA
XXIV Brigade RFA
110th Battery, RFA
111th Battery, RFA
112th Battery, RFA
XXXVIII Brigade RFA
24th Battery, RFA
34th Battery, RFA
72nd Battery, RFA
XII (Howitzer) Brigade RFA
43rd (Howitzer) Battery, RFA
86th (Howitzer) Battery, RFA
87th (Howitzer) Battery, RFA
24th Heavy Battery, RGA
Engineers
12th Field Company, RE
38th Field Company, RE

Army troops

Mounted troops:
Composite Regiment drawn from the North Irish Horse (A and C Squadrons) and South Irish Horse (B Squadron).
Siege Artillery:
(Royal Garrison Artillery units)
No. 1 Siege Battery
No. 2 Siege Battery
No. 3 Siege Battery
No. 4 Siege Battery
No. 5 Siege Battery
No. 6 Siege Battery
Infantry:
1st The Queen's Own Cameron Highlanders

Royal Flying Corps
The Royal Flying Corps units in France were commanded by Brigadier-General Sir David Henderson, with Lieutenant-Colonel Frederick Sykes as his Chief of Staff.

2nd Aeroplane Squadron, Major C J Burke
3rd Aeroplane Squadron, Major J M Salmond
4th Aeroplane Squadron, Major G H Raleigh
5th Aeroplane Squadron, Major J F A Higgins
6th Aeroplane Squadron Major J H W Becke
1st Aircraft Park, Major A D Carden

Lines of communication defence troops
1st The Devonshire Regiment
2nd The Royal Welch Fusiliers
1st The Cameronians (Scottish Rifles)
1st The Duke of Cambridge's Own (Middlesex Regiment)
2nd Princess Louise's (Argyll and Sutherland Highlanders)

Unit strengths
A cavalry regiment contained three squadrons and was provided with two machine-guns. An infantry battalion contained four companies and two machine-guns.

A Royal Horse Artillery battery contained six 13-pounder guns, whilst a Royal Field Artillery battery contained six 18-pounder guns, or six 4.5-inch howitzers. A heavy battery of the Royal Garrison Artillery contained four 60 pounder guns. Each battery had two ammunition wagons per gun, and each artillery brigade contained its own ammunition column.

Each division received an anti-aircraft detachment of 1-pounder pom-pom guns in September, attached to the divisional artillery.

The Cavalry Division had a total of 12 cavalry regiments in four brigades, and each infantry division had 12 battalions in three brigades. The strength of the Cavalry Division (not counting 5th Cavalry Brigade) came to 9,269 all ranks, with 9,815 horses, 24 13-pounder guns and 24 machine-guns. The strength of each infantry division came to 18,073 all ranks, with 5,592 horses, 76 guns and 24 machine-guns.

Units not employed in the Expeditionary Force
In broad numeric terms, the British Expeditionary Force represented half the combat strength of the British Army; as an imperial power, a sizeable portion of the army had to be kept aside for overseas garrisons. Home defence was expected to be provided by the volunteers of the Territorial Force and by the reserves.

The total strength of the Regular Army in July was 125,000 men in the British Isles, with 75,000 in India and Burma and a further 33,000 in other overseas postings. The Army Reserve came to 145,000 men, with 64,000 in the Militia (or Special Reserve) and 272,000 in the Territorial Force.

Home service
The peacetime regular establishment in the British Isles was eighty-one battalions of infantry — in theory, one battalion of each line regiment was deployed on home service and one on overseas service at any given point, rotating the battalions every few years — and nineteen regiments of cavalry.

Aside from those earmarked for the Expeditionary Force, there were three battalions of Guards and eight of line infantry (including those in the Channel Islands) – roughly a division's worth. In the event, six battalions of these regulars were deployed to the Continent along with the Expeditionary Force, to act as army troops. The Border Regiment and Alexandra, Princess of Wales's Own (Yorkshire Regiment) had the unusual distinction of being the only two regular infantry regiments not to contribute troops to the Expeditionary Force; both would first see action with 7th Division, which landed in October.

Given the rioting that had occurred during the national strikes 1911–12, there was concern that there would be unrest in London at the outbreak of war. Consequently, three cavalry regiments — the 1st Life Guards, 2nd Life Guards, and Royal Horse Guards – were stationed in the London District and not earmarked for the Expeditionary Force; these each provided a squadron for a composite regiment, which served with the 4th Cavalry Brigade. In addition, there were three Royal Field Artillery brigades, and a number of Royal Horse Artillery batteries, not earmarked for overseas service.

After the Expeditionary Force had departed, this left a total regular establishment of three cavalry regiments (somewhat depleted) and five infantry battalions – less than a tenth of the normal combat strength of the home forces, and mostly deployed around London. This defensive force would be supplemented by the units of the Territorial Force, which were called up on the outbreak of war — indeed, many were already embodied for their summer training when mobilisation was ordered — and by the Special Reserve.

The Territorial Force was planned with a mobilisation strength of fourteen divisions, each structured along the lines of a regular division with twelve infantry battalions, four artillery brigades, two engineer companies, &c. – and fourteen brigades of Yeomanry cavalry. It was envisaged that these units would be used solely for home defence, though in the event almost all volunteered for overseas service; the first battalions arrived on the Continent in November.

Overseas service
Forty-eight battalions of infantry were serving in India – the equivalent of four regular divisions — with five in Malta, four in South Africa, four in Egypt, and a dozen in various other Imperial outposts. A further nine regular cavalry regiments were serving in India, with two in South Africa and one in Egypt.

The forces in the rest of the British Empire were not expected to contribute to the Expeditionary Force. A sizeable proportion of these were part of the ten-division Army of India, a mixture of local forces and British regulars; planning had begun in August 1913 to arrange how the Indian forces could be used in a European war, and a tentative plan had been made for two infantry divisions and a cavalry brigade to be added to the Expeditionary Force; these were dispatched, in the event, but did not arrive in France until October.

In the event, most of the overseas garrison units were withdrawn as soon as they could be replaced with Territorial battalions, and new regular divisions were formed piecemeal in the United Kingdom. None of these units arrived in time to see service with the Expeditionary Force.

See also
British infantry brigades of the First World War

Notes

References
Appendix 1: Order of battle of the British Expeditionary Force, August 1914. In: History of the Great War: Military Operations, France and Belgium 1914, by J. E. Edmonds. Macmillan & Co., London, 1922. – for all details on Expeditionary Force units
The British Army: 1914, Mark Conrad, 1996. – for the details of locations of non-BEF units. (Archive copy from 2007)
p. 427, Whitaker's Almanack 1939. J. Whitaker & Sons: London, 1938. – for numerical strengths in July 1914.

External links
A list of the staff officers of the Expeditionary Force in 1914 is given in 

Military history of the United Kingdom during World War I
World War I orders of battle
British Army in World War I